Thomas Edward Hawkins (4 August 1885 – 16 February 1907) was an Australian rules footballer who played with South Melbourne in the Victorian Football League (VFL).

Hawkins had been employed in Melbourne where he caught a serious cold. His father brought him home to Ballarat to recover. Dispute careful nursing by his mother his health deteriorated  and he died.

Notes

External links 

1885 births
1907 deaths
Australian rules footballers from Melbourne
Sydney Swans players
Kyabram Football Club players
People from North Melbourne